Noah Al-Khulaifi  (born on 10 May 1999) is a Qatari swimmer. He competed at the 2016 Summer Olympics in the men's 100 metre backstroke event; his time of 1:07.47 in the heats did not qualify him for the semifinals.

References

1999 births
Living people
Qatari male swimmers
Olympic swimmers of Qatar
Swimmers at the 2016 Summer Olympics
Swimmers at the 2018 Asian Games
Asian Games competitors for Qatar
Male backstroke swimmers